R v Jones, [1986] 2 S.C.R. 284 is an early leading Supreme Court of Canada decision on the freedom of religion under section 2(a) of the Canadian Charter of Rights and Freedoms and the right to security of person under section 7.

Background
Thomas Jones was a pastor in a fundamentalist church who did not want his three children educated in school and instead was teaching them himself in the basement of the church. The Alberta Schools Act requires all parents to send their children to school unless the parent can show that they are going to an accredited private school or the government has approved the home-school curriculum. Jones was charged with truancy under the Schools Act.

Jones argued that the rule requiring government approval to educate his children involves "his acknowledging that the government, rather than God, has the final authority over the education of his children" and so contravenes his right to freedom of religion under section 2(a) and his right to have control over how his children are educated which is protected under section 7.

Reasons of the court
Justice Gérard La Forest, for the majority, held that the Act did not violate the Charter. He found that the degree of control that the Act imposed on Jones' children was far from absolute. It was a reasonable requirement and was supported by a compelling interest that it could be justified in a free and democratic society. The certification procedure was in no way manifestly unfair or contravened any principles of fundamental justice and so did not invoke section 7. While the Supreme Court ruled that although Thomas Jones did have to license the school, the provincial government had to provide reasonable accommodation for religious belief. The court ruled that the province must "'delicately and sensitively weigh the competing interests so as to respect as much as possible the religious convictions as guaranteed by the Charter,"

References

External links
 

Canadian Charter of Rights and Freedoms case law
Supreme Court of Canada cases
Canadian freedom of religion case law
1986 in Canadian case law
Education case law
Education in Canada
Alberta litigation
Homeschooling